Lutrelle Fleming "Lu" Palmer, Jr. (March 28, 1922 – September 12, 2004) was an American reporter, political activist, radio show host, and newspaper publisher in Chicago.

Biography
Palmer was born in Newport News, Virginia to Myrtle and Lutrelle Sr., a school principal. He had two sisters, who had careers in education. Palmer became a journalist after earning a degree from Virginia University in 1942, a masters from Syracuse University in 1948, and his Ph.D. from the University of Iowa in 1950. He served the next fifty years as a reporter, newspaper publisher and radio commentator for the black community. From 1983 until retiring in 2013, he also had an issue related talk show.

Palmer was a reporter for the ‘’Chicago Defender’’, as well as a writer for newspapers including the ‘‘Chicago Daily News’’ and the Tri-State Defender as a columnist. 
 
He founded his own newspaper Black X-Press Info.

Often outspoken he losted sponsorship of his 13-year radio program, as supporter of Harold Washington, who with Palmer's help became African American Mayor of Chicago
 
Palmer was associated recruiter and organizer and preceptor of Associated Colleges of the Midwest from 1970 until 1990.

Honours
He was inducted into the Chicago State University Black Writers' Hall of Fame, the Black Journalists Hall of Fame, and was awarded the Jomo Kenyatta Award for Political Activism, Grambling State's Outstanding Service Award, Bell Labs' Black Achievement Against the Odds Award in 1982, and received the Proclamation of Unity Award in 1976.

Personal life
His second cousin was publisher Ruth Apilado, a newspaper editor and novelist, who founded America's Intercultural Magazine.
 
 He had seven children with wife Jorja English Palmer, and lived in Chicago's South Side

References

1922 births
2004 deaths
African-American journalists
Syracuse University alumni
20th-century African-American people
21st-century African-American people